The 57th Rescue Squadron (57 RQS) is part of the 31st Operations Group, 31st Fighter Wing at Aviano Air Base, Italy. As part of the 31st Operations Group it conducts pararescue operations in support of higher command directives, at times utilizing HH-60G Pave Hawk and Lockheed HC-130 Hercules aircraft flown by other rescue squadrons such as the 56th Rescue Squadron, also based at Aviano. The 57th Rescue Squadron is a combat-ready squadron of pararescue personnel capable of performing combat rescue and personnel retrieval missions in theaters of operations worldwide. The squadron does not operate any aircraft.

Mission
The 57th Rescue Squadron is a combat-ready search and rescue squadron composed of USAF Pararescue and Survival, Evasion, Resistance and Escape personnel, capable of executing all-weather search and rescue missions day or night in hostile environments in support of USAFE, USEUCOM, and NATO operations. It employs advanced search and rescue equipment. The squadron is capable of deploying to any theater of operations in the world.

History

The squadron was first activated at Lajes Field in the Azores in November 1952 as the 57th Air Rescue Squadron in a reorganization of Air Rescue Service.  The 7th Air Rescue Squadron at Wheelus Field, Libya was expanded into a group and each of its remotely stationed lettered flights was replaced by a new squadron.  The 57th replaced Flight B of the 7th Squadron and assumed its personnel and equipment.  The squadron mission was to intercept aircraft in distress while crossing the Atlantic and to escort them back to Lajes Field.  The 57th also provided search and rescue for both downed aircraft and for ships.

One of the squadron's most notable achievements occurred in 1959, when a Portuguese ship, the SS Arnel, which had struck rocks near the island of Santa Maria.  The squadron evacuated 48 persons from the Arnel.

By the early 1960s the squadron had assumed the mission of providing support for Project Gemini and Project Apollo space missions.  To reflect this mission, it was renamed the 57th Air Recovery Squadron in July 1965.  The following January Air Rescue Service became Aerospace Rescue and Recovery Service and all of its squadrons were renamed, no matter their mission.  The squadron was inactivated at Lajes in late 1972, when the Portuguese Air Force assumed the mid-Atlantic rescue mission.

The 57th was reactivated as the 57th Rescue Squadron at Lakenheath in February 2015. Personnel for the squadron came from the 56th Rescue Squadron, with no additional manpower or aircraft. Aircrews and the HH-60G Pave Hawk helicopters remained in the 56th Squadron.  The separation of pararescue airmen into a separate unit "align[ed] the personnel recovery function within United States Air Forces Europe to the standard Air Force structure," officials said. Creating two rescue squadrons at Lakenheath is intended to replicate combat conditions because pararescuemen frequently deploy separately from their rescue helicopters and planes. The 56th was the last squadron in the Air Force to split its pararescue and flying functions into two squadrons.

In May 2018, the 57th and its sister squadron, the 56th RQS, relocated to Aviano Air Base, Italy.

Lineage
 Constituted as the 57th Air Rescue Squadron on 17 October 1952
 Activated on 14 November 1952
 Redesignated 57th Air Recovery Squadron on 1 July 1965
 Redesignated 57th Aerospace Rescue and Recovery Squadron on 8 January 1966
 Inactivated on 1 December 1972
 Redesignated 57th Rescue Squadron
 Activated c. 18 February 2015

Assignments

 7th Air Rescue Group: 14 November 1952
 9th Air Rescue Group: 8 December 1956
 Air Rescue Service: 24 June 1958
 Atlantic Aerospace Rescue and Recovery Center (later 40th Aerospace Rescue and Recovery Wing): 8 January 1966 – 1 January 1972
 48th Operations Group: c. 18 February 2015 – Present
 31st Operations Group: May 2018

Stations
 Lajes Field, Azores, Portugal, 14 November 1952 – 1 December 1972
 RAF Lakenheath, England, c. 18 February 2015 – April
 Aviano Air Base, Italy, May 2018 – present

Aircraft
 Boeing SB-17 Flying Fortress
 Douglas SC-54 (later HC-54D)
 Sikorsky SH-19
 Lockheed HC-130 Hercules

References

External links
 
  (Details of midair collision between a squadron HC-54D and a HC-97G of the 55th Air Rescue Squadron while filming a training film.)
  (Image of an early 57th Air Rescue Squadron patch)
  (Squadron participation in 1966 rescue of MV Monte Palomares)

057
1952 establishments in Portugal
1972 disestablishments in Portugal
2015 establishments in England